The Deram Anthology 1966–1968 is a compilation album by David Bowie, released in 1997. It collects together most of the material Bowie recorded for Deram Records that has been previously released in some form, including the 1967 debut album in its entirety (tracks 5-18), in chronological order. Tracks 24–27 were mixed/recorded in 1969 after Bowie was dropped from Deram Records and were for the promotional video "Love You Till Tuesday", made to sell Bowie to a new label. Thus Deram originally had nothing to do with these tracks.

Originally this was planned to be a two-disc release featuring several previously unreleased tracks, but Bowie vetoed the inclusion of such material. Reportedly the tracks Bowie vetoed included songs called "Pussy Cat", "Back to Where You've Never Been", "Funny Smile", "Bunny Thing", a cover of The Velvet Underground's "Waiting for the Man" and German-language versions of "Love You 'Till Tuesday" and "When I Live My Dream" (the last three have been widely bootlegged).
A reel to reel copy taken directly from the master tapes exists of the songs "Funny Smile", "Bunny Thing", and "Pussy Cat" and is owned by a previous employee of Decca Records who worked for the company at the time the tracks were recorded.  In 2019 these recordings have been put up for auction by Omega Auctions.

Track listing
All songs written by David Bowie.

References

David Bowie compilation albums
1997 compilation albums
Deram Records compilation albums